Mohamed Attoumane (born September 9, 1981) is a Comorian swimmer, who specialized in sprint freestyle events. At age twenty-seven, Attoumane represented his nation at the 2008 Summer Olympics in Beijing. He competed in the men's 50 m freestyle, and swam in the sixth heat of the competition, with a time of 29.63 seconds, finishing only in last place, and ninety-first in the overall standings.

References

External links
NBC Olympics Profile

1981 births
Living people
Comorian male freestyle swimmers
Olympic swimmers of the Comoros
Swimmers at the 2008 Summer Olympics